Sibusiso Barnabas Dlamini (born 1 September 1980 in Mbabane) is a Swazi football striker who currently plays for Malanti Chiefs. He has been capped for Eswatini.

Clubs
1998-2000 :  Royal Leopards
2000–2001 :  Mamelodi Sundowns
2001–2003 :  Black Leopards
2003–2004 :  Kaizer Chiefs
2004–2006 :  Black Leopards
2006–2007 :  Moroka Swallows
2007–2008 :  Black Leopards
2008–2011:  Mpumalanga Black Aces
2012–2014: Malanti Chiefs

References

1980 births
Living people
People from Mbabane
Swazi footballers
Swazi expatriate footballers
Eswatini international footballers
Royal Leopards F.C. players
Mamelodi Sundowns F.C. players
Kaizer Chiefs F.C. players
Moroka Swallows F.C. players
Black Leopards F.C. players
Mpumalanga Black Aces F.C. players
Association football forwards
Swazi expatriate sportspeople in South Africa
Expatriate soccer players in South Africa
South African Premier Division players